Ometepe Airport  is the only airport on Ometepe, the largest island in Lake Nicaragua.

The airport was built in May 2014 at a cost of almost .

The runway begins at the shoreline, and west approach and departure are over the water.

Airlines and destinations

Currently only one airline flies to Ometepe Island on a circuit flight to other airports in Nicaragua, including Managua's Sandino International Airport on Sundays and Thursdays.

Although this airport is considered international and does have a passport control and customs house, there are currently no international commercial flights that fly to this airport.

Charter flights are available. (Aerotaxi) on Cessna 208 12-passenger aircraft and 45-passenger ATR 42 caravan. The air terminal also receives private flights of small planes and helicopters.

See also

 Transport in Nicaragua
 List of airports in Nicaragua

References

External links
OpenStreetMap - Ometepe Airport
OurAirports - Ometepe Airport
FallingRain - Ometepe Airport

Airports in Nicaragua
Río San Juan Department